Fox Hill once known as Rip Raps is an area within the eastern part of Hampton, Virginia. It is mostly a residential community with a few small businesses scattered throughout. Fox Hill is bordered to the south by Phoebus, a neighborhood and former town that was incorporated within the city of Hampton; and Buckroe, a small beachfront community.  Fox Hill Extends from Bloxom's Corner down Beach Road to Grandview Island and includes areas down Beach Road and borders Colonial Acres at Silver Isles Blvd.

Areas of interest 
Grandvew is an island that is connected by marshland. It is also a beachfront neighborhood on the Chesapeake Bay. The Back River Light once stood just offshore.  Fox Hill is served by Wallace's Marina located at the end of Dandy Point Road and is a popular place for fishermen due to its proximity and access to the Chesapeake Bay.

Schools 
Francis Asbury Elementary School is the only school within Fox Hill itself.  Kecoughtan High School is the only high school near the Fox Hill area and serves the neighborhood and is one of four high schools in the city. Syms Middle School, Jones Magnet Middle, Phillips Elementary, and Baron Elementary are other schools near Fox Hill.

Organizations 
Clark Cemetery Association

Cornerstone Fellowship Church

First Calvary Baptist Church

First United Methodist Church of Fox Hill

Fox Hill Athletic Association

Fox Hill Central United Methodist Church

Fox Hill Crop Club

Fox Hill Historical Society

Fox Hill Ladies Auxiliary

Fox Hill Senior Citizens Club

Fox Hill Volunteer Fire Company

Francis Asbury Elementary School PTA

Grandview Island Beach Partners

Grandview Shores Civic League

Kecoughtan High School Band

RIley's Way Homeowner's Association

Southall Landing Homeowner's Association

Wallace Memorial United Methodist Church

References

Neighborhoods in Hampton, Virginia